The Col de Marsolino is a mountain pass in the Haute-Corse department of Corsica, France.
The pass is in the west of the Monte Cinto massif.
It connects Calvi and Calenzana to Galéria. 
Its low altitude allows it to be open almost all year round.

Toponymy

The pass takes its name from the ancient parish of Armito-Marsolino which covered the upper Ruisseau de Marsulinu valley.

Geography

The Marsolino Pass is located on a secondary mountain range in the Monte Cinto massif, joining the main chain of the island at the  Muvrella.
The range extends west to the sea at Punta di Ciuttone north of the Gulf of Galeria.

It separates the valley of the Ruisseau de Pinzutella stream (Ronca river), a tributary of the Figarella to the north, from the valley of the Ruisseau de Marsolinu, a tributary of the Fango river to the south. It is an entrance to the regional natural park of Corsica.

It is located on the only major road in the west of the island: the D81 (formerly RN 199) connecting Calvi to Vico and Ajaccio.

A pylon supporting telecommunications antennas is installed about twenty meters above the pass.

Events
On August 13, 1992, a plane crash occurred at the pass, killing all four occupants of the aircraft: David Vallier, a pilot practicing at the Ajaccio Air Club, and three passengers, Yvon Briant, Member of the Assembly. Nathalie Péan his wife, director of NRJ radio, and Hugues their son.

Cycling

The Col de Marsolino was part of the Tour de France for the first time in 2013, during the 3rd stage. It was classified as a 2nd category climb. The Frenchman Pierre Rolland took the lead at the top.

Notes

Sources

Mountain passes of Haute-Corse